Below a list of all national champions in the men's high jump event in track and field from several countries since 1980.

Argentina

1980: Fernando Pastoriza
1981: Oscar Baronetto
1982: Carlos Gambetta
1983: Fernando Pastoriza
1984: Fernando Pastoriza
1985: Fernando Pastoriza
1986: Fernando Pastoriza
1987: Fernando Pastoriza
1988: Fernando Moreno
1989: Fernando Pastoriza
1990: Fernando Moreno
1991: Fernando Moreno
1992: Fernando Moreno
1993: Fernando Moreno
1994: Erasmo Jara
1995: Erasmo Jara
1996: Erasmo Jara
1997: Erasmo Jara
1998: Erasmo Jara
1999: Erasmo Jara
2000: Erasmo Jara
2001: Erasmo Jara
2002: Erasmo Jara
2003: Erasmo Jara
2004: Leandro Piedrabuena
2005: Erasmo Jara
2006: Santiago Guerci

Australia

1980: David Morrow
1981: David Hoyle
1982: Larry Sayers
1983: Mark Barratt
1984: John Atkinson
1985: Michael Allen
1986: Lee Balkin (USA)
1987: Marc Howard
1988: David Anderson
1989: Ian Garrett
1990: David Anderson
1991: Tim Forsyth
1992: Tim Forsyth
1993: Tim Forsyth
1994: Tim Forsyth
1995: Ian Garrett
1996: Chris Anderson
1997: Tim Forsyth
1998: Tim Forsyth
1999: Ron Garlett
2000: Nick Moroney
2001: Nick Moroney
2002: Nick Moroney
2003: Joshua Lodge
2004: Nick Moroney
2005: Nick Moroney
2006: Nick Moroney
2007: Liam Zamel-Paez 
2008: Cal Pearce 
2009: Liam Zamel-Paez 
2010: Liam Zamel-Paez
2011: Chris Armet
2012: Nick Moroney
2013: Brandon Starc
2014: Nik Bojic

Belarus

1992: Vladimir Zaboronyok
1993: Oleg Zhukovskiy
1994: Nikolay Moskalev
1995: Gintaras Varanauskas (LTU)
1996: Aleksandr Buglakov
1997: Oleg Vorobey
1998: Oleg Vorobey
1999: Aleksey Lesnichiy
2000: Oleg Prokopov
2001: Aleksey Lesnichiy
2002: Aleksey Lesnichiy
2003: Aleksandr Veryutin
2004: Gennadiy Moroz
2005: Aleksandr Veryutin
2006: Aleksandr Veryutin

Belgium

1980: Guy Moreau
1981: Peter Soetewey
1982: William Nachtegael
1983: Eddy Annys
1984: Marc Borra
1985: Eddy Annys
1986: Patrick Steemans
1987: Marc Hallemeersch
1988: Dimitri Maenhout
1989: Gerolf De Backer
1990: Gerolf De Backer
1991: Dimitri Maenhout
1992: Dimitri Maenhout
1993: Dominique Sandron
1994: Dominique Sandron
1995: Carl Van Roeyen
1996: Livio Baggio
1997: Carl Van Roeyen
1998: Carl Van Roeyen
1999: Patrick De Paepe
2000: Patrick De Paepe
2001: Stijn Stroobants
2002: Stijn Stroobants
2003: Benoît Braconnier
2004: Stijn Stroobants
2005: Stijn Stroobants
2006: Stijn Stroobants
2007: Timothy Hubert 
2008: Tim Rummens 
2009: Stijn Stroobants
2010: Stijn Stroobants 
2011: Timothy Hubert
2012: Bram Ghuys
2013: Bram Ghuys
2014: Bram Ghuys
2015: Fabiano Kalandula
2016: Bram Ghuys

Brazil

2001: Fabricio Romero de Azevedo
2002: Fabricio Romero de Azevedo
2003: Jesse de Lima
2004: Jesse de Lima
2005: Baptista Fábio Resende
2006: Jesse de Lima
2007: Jesse de Lima
2008: Jesse de Lima
2009: Jesse de Lima
2010: Jesse de Lima
2011: Rafael Uchona dos Santo

Bulgaria

1980: Atanas Mladenov
1981: Georgi Gadzhev
1982: Atanas Mladenov
1983: Rumen Yotsov
1984: Georgi Gadzhev
1985: Valentin Gatov
1986: Georgi Dakov
1987: Georgi Dakov
1988: Georgi Dakov
1989: Kotzo Kostov
1990: Georgi Dakov
1991: Georgi Dakov
1992: Robert Marinov
1993: Robert Marinov
1994: Dimitar Toychev
1995: Ivan Ivanov
1996: Georgi Getov
1997: Metin Dormushev
1998: Metin Dormushev
1999: Ivan Varbanov
2000: Angel Kararadev
2001: Angel Kararadev
2002: Georgi Getov
2003: Georgi Getov
2004: Georgi Getov
2005: Stoyan Kekov
2006: Stefan Altanov

Canada

1969: Wild Wedmann
1975: Richard Cuttell
1980: Claude Ferragne
1981: Milton Ottey
1982: Milton Ottey
1983: Milton Ottey
1984: Milton Ottey
1985: Alain Metellus
1986: Milton Ottey
1987: Milton Ottey
1988: Milton Ottey
1989: Alain Metellus
1990: Cory Siermachesky
1991: Vinton Bennett
1992: Cory Siermachesky
1993: Alex Zaliauskas
1994: Cory Siermachesky
1995: Charles Lefrançois
1996: Kwaku Boateng
1997: Mark Boswell
1998: Kwaku Boateng
1999: Kwaku Boateng
2000: Mark Boswell
2001: Mark Boswell
2002: Mark Boswell
2003: Mark Boswell
2004: Mark Boswell
2005: Kwaku Boateng
2006: Kwaku Boateng
2007: Michael Mason
2008: Michael Mason
2009: Derek Watkins
2010: Derek Drouin
2011: Mark Dillon
2012: Derek Drouin
2013: Derek Drouin
2014: Derek Drouin
2015: Derek Drouin
2016: Derek Drouin
2017: Michael Mason

PR China

1988: Zhu Jianhua
1989: Liu Yunpeng
1990: Zhou Zhongge
1991: Xu Yang
1992: Xu Yang
1993: Xu Yang
1994: Tao Xu
1995: Bi Hongyong
1996: Niu Jiang
1997: Bi Hongyong
1998: Zhou Zhongge
1999: Wang Zhouzhou
2000: Zhou Zhongge
2001: Zhou Zhongge
2002: Wang Zhouzhou
2003: Wang Zhouzhou
2004: Liu Yang
2005: Zhang Shufeng

Cuba

1986: Javier Sotomayor
1987: Javier Sotomayor
1988: Javier Sotomayor
1989: Javier Sotomayor
1990: Lázaro Chacón
1991: Javier Sotomayor
1992: Javier Sotomayor
1993: Javier Sotomayor
1994: Javier Sotomayor
1995: Javier Sotomayor
1996: Andrés Leal
1997: Andrés Leal
1998: Javier Sotomayor
1999: Javier Sotomayor
2000: Lázaro Suárez
2001: Javier Sotomayor
2002: Yordán Lugones
2003: Dailen Ortega
2004: Yunier Carrillo
2005: Lisvany Pérez
2006: Víctor Moya

Denmark

1980: Jesper Tørring
1981: Leon Axen
1982: Flemming Vejsnæs
1983: René Tyranski Nielsen
1984: René Tyranski Nielsen
1985: Stig Oxholm
1986: René Tyranski Nielsen
1987: Lars Bach Jensen
1988: Michael Mikkelsen
1989: Michael Mikkelsen
1990: Michael Mikkelsen
1991: Michael Mikkelsen
1992: Michael Mikkelsen
1993: Lars Werge Andersen
1994: Michael Mikkelsen
1995: Lars Werge Andersen
1996: Michael Mikkelsen
1997: Michael Mikkelsen
1998: Anders Møller
1999: Michael Odgård
2000: Christoffer Holst
2001: Anders Møller
2002: Jens Møller Boeriis
2003: Anders Black
2004: Anders Black
2005: Anders Black
2006: Jens Møller Boeriis
2007: Jens Møller Boeriis

Estonia

1917*: Sergei Rutkovski
1918*: Artur Proos
1919*: Bernhard Abrams
1920: Aleksander Klumberg
1921: Aleksander Klumberg
1922: Aleksander Klumberg
1923: Aleksander Klumberg
1924: Aleksander Klumberg
1925: Paul Steinberg
1926: Evald Roht
1927: Aleksander Klumberg
1928: Evald Roht
1929: Evald Kink
1930: Gustav Sule
1931: Gert Schmidt
1932: Gert Schmidt
1933: Aksel Kuuse
1934: Gert Schmidt
1935: Aksel Kuuse
1936: Aksel Kuuse
1937: Aksel Kuuse
1938: Olev Kaldre
1939: Olev Kaldre
1940: Lembit Kiisa
1941: -
1942: Viktor Palango
1943: Viktor Palango
1944: Viktor Palango
1945: Ants Kalda
1946: Erich Pilliroog
1947: Erich Pilliroog
1948: Erich Pilliroog
1949: Ülo Raidma
1950: Heino Apart
1951: Heino Apart
1952: Heino Apart
1953: Uno Palu
1954: Juhan Unger
1955: Ivo Jürviste
1956: Juhan Unger
1957: Rein Ellermaa
1958: Rein Ellermaa
1959: Jaak Ilves
1960: Rein Ellermaa
1961: Rein Ellermaa
1962: Valdeko Ruven
1963: Igor Kurve
1964: Igor Kurve
1965: Jüri Tarmak
1966: Jüri Tarmak
1967: Jüri Tarmak
1968: Vello Lumi
1969: Toomas Berendsen
1970: Valeri Peterson
1971: Andres Külvand
1972: Vello Lumi
1973: Villu Mengel
1974: Heiki Kask
1975: Vello Lumi
1976: Vello Lumi
1977: Heiki Kask
1978: Tiit Pahapill
1979: Tiit Pahapill
1980: Tiit Pahapill
1981: Ain Evard
1982: Ain Evard
1983: Tarmo Valgepea
1984: Kalev Martsepp
1985: Ain Evard
1986: Ain Evard
1987: Ain Evard
1988: Ain Evard
1989: Ain Evard
1990: Ain Evard
1991: Ain Evard
1992: Ain Evard
1993: Ain Evard
1994: Ain Evard
1995: Ramon Kaju
1996: Ramon Kaju
1997: Marko Turban
1998: Ramon Kaju
1999: Ramon Kaju
2000: Marko Aleksejev
2001: Ramon Kaju
2002: Marko Aleksejev
2003: Marko Aleksejev
2004: Marko Aleksejev
2005: Marko Aleksejev
2006: Marko Aleksejev
2007: Marko Aleksejev
2008: Karl Lumi
2009: Karl Lumi
2010: Karl Lumi
2011: Karl Lumi
2012: Karl Lumi
2013: Karl Lumi
2014: Hendrik Lepik
2015: Karl Lumi
2016: Karl Lumi
2017: Karl Lumi
2018: Karl Lumi
2019: Karl Lumi
2020: Kristjan Tafenau
2021: Hendrik Lillemets
2022: Hendrik Lillemets

* unofficial championships

Finland

1980: Ossi Aura
1981: Juha Porkka
1982: Mikko Levola
1983: Jouko Kilpi
1984: Erkki Niemi
1985: Mikko Levola
1986: Timo Ruuskanen
1987: Mikko Levola
1988: Veli-Pekka Kokkonen
1989: Mikko Levola
1990: Matti Viitala
1991: Juha Isolehto
1992: Juha Isolehto
1993: Juha Isolehto
1994: Juha Isolehto
1995: Juha Isolehto
1996: Oskari Frösén
1997: Juha Isolehto
1998: Mika Polku
1999: Oskari Frösén
2000: Mika Polku
2001: Mika Polku
2002: Oskari Frösén
2003: Mika Polku
2004: Oskari Frösén
2005: Oskari Frösén
2006: Oskari Frösén
2007: Oskari Frösén
2008: Oskari Frösén
2009: Oskari Frösén
2010: Osku Torro
2011: Jussi Viita

France

1980: Paul Tanon
1981: Franck Bonnet
1982: Franck Verzy
1983: Moussa Sagna Fall (SEN)
1984: Franck Verzy
1985: Dominique Hernandez
1986: Franck Verzy
1987: Jean-Charles Gicquel
1988: Dominique Hernandez
1989: Joël Vincent
1990: Jean-Charles Gicquel
1991: Joël Vincent
1992: Joël Vincent
1993: Xavier Robilliard
1994: Jean-Charles Gicquel
1995: Jean-Charles Gicquel
1996: Didier Detchénique
1997: Didier Detchénique
1998: Didier Detchénique
1999: Mustapha Raïfak
2000: Dieudonné Opota
2001: Grégory Gabella
2002: Dieudonné Opota
2003: Joan Charmant
2004: Grégory Gabella
2005: Grégory Gabella
2006: Mickaël Hanany
2007: Mickaël Hanany
2008: Mathias Cianci
2009: Mickaël Hanany

Germany

East Germany

1980: Gerd Wessig
1981: Rolf Beilschmidt
1982: Jörg Freimuth
1983: Andreas Sam
1984: Gerd Wessig
1985: Gerd Wessig
1986: Gerd Wessig
1987: Matthias Grebenstein
1988: Gerd Wessig
1989: Gerd Wessig
1990: Uwe Bellmann

West Germany

1980: Dietmar Mögenburg
1981: Dietmar Mögenburg
1982: Dietmar Mögenburg
1983: Dietmar Mögenburg
1984: Dietmar Mögenburg
1985: Dietmar Mögenburg
1986: Carlo Thränhardt
1987: Dietmar Mögenburg
1988: Dietmar Mögenburg
1989: Dietmar Mögenburg
1990: Dietmar Mögenburg

Unified Germany

1991: Carlo Thränhardt
1992: Ralf Sonn
1993: Hendrik Beyer
1994: Hendrik Beyer
1995: Hendrik Beyer
1996: Wolfgang Kreissig
1997: Martin Buss
1998: Martin Buss
1999: Martin Buss
2000: Wolfgang Kreissig
2001: Martin Buss
2002: Martin Buss
2003: Roman Fricke
2004: Roman Fricke
2005: Eike Onnen
2006: Eike Onnen
2007: Benjamin Lauckner
2008: Raúl Spank
2009: Eike Onnen
2010: Raúl Spank
2011: Raúl Spank
2012: Eike Onnen
2013: Matthias Haverney
2014: Martin Günther
2015: David Nopper

Great Britain

1980: Carlo Thränhardt (FRG)
1981: James Frazier (USA)
1982: Takao Sakamoto (JPN)
1983: Leo Williams (USA)
1984: Francisco Centelles (CUB)
1985: Milton Ottey (CAN)
1986: Geoff Parsons
1987: Floyd Manderson
1988: Geoff Parsons
1989: Dalton Grant
1990: Dalton Grant
1991: Hollis Conway (USA) 
1992: Steve Smith
1993: Tim Forsyth (AUS) 
1994: Brendan Reilly
1995: Steve Smith
1996: Steve Smith
1997: Mark Mandy (IRL) 
1998: Dalton Grant
1999: Steve Smith
2000: Ben Challenger
2001: Ben Challenger
2002: Dalton Grant
2003: Ben Challenger
2004: Ben Challenger
2005: Ben Challenger
2006: Martyn Bernard
2007: Tom Parsons
2008: Tom Parsons
2009: Germaine Mason
2010: Martyn Bernard 
2011: Tom Parsons
2012: Robert Grabarz

Greece

1983: Panayotis Panayos
1984: Dimitrios Kattis
1985: Kosmas Michalopoulos
1986: Kosmas Michalopoulos
1987: Panayotis Kondaxakis
1988: Lambros Papakostas
1989: Kosmas Michalopoulos
1990: Lambros Papakostas
1991: Lambros Papakostas
1992: Lambros Papakostas
1993: Lambros Papakostas
1994: Dimitrios Kokotis
1995: Lambros Papakostas
1996: Ioannis Yantsios
1997: Lambros Papakostas
1998: Dimitrios Kokotis
1999: Konstantinos Liapis
2000: Lambros Papakostas
2001: Dimitrios Syrakos
2002: Ioannis Constantinou (CYP)
2003: Ioannis Constantinou (CYP)
2004: Dimitrios Syrakos
2005: Kyriacos Ioannou (CYP)
2006: Nikolaos Giosis
2007: Kyriacos Ioannou (CYP)
2008: Konstadinos Baniotis
2009: Konstadinos Baniotis
2010: Konstadinos Baniotis
2011: Konstadinos Baniotis
2012: Dimitrios Chondrokoukis
2013: Konstadinos Baniotis
2014: Antonios Mastoras

Hungary

1980: Zoltán Társi
1981: István Széles
1982: Tibor Gerstenbrein
1983: István Gibicsár
1984: István Gibicsár
1985: István Gibicsár
1986: Gyula Németh
1987: Ferenc Pál
1988: Benõ Bese
1989: Gyula Németh
1990: Benõ Bese
1991: András Tresch
1992: Péter Deutsch
1993: Péter Deutsch
1994: Zoltán Bakler
1995: Péter Deutsch
1996: István Kovács
1997: István Kovács
1998: Attila Zsivoczky
1999: Gergely Bata
2000: Román Fehér
2001: Román Fehér
2002: Román Fehér
2003: László Boros
2004: László Boros
2005: László Boros
2006: László Boros
2007: Árpád Lehoczky
2008: Olivér Harsányi
2009: Olivér Harsányi
2010: Dávid Fajoyomi
2011: Olivér Harsányi
2012: Olivér Harsányi
2013: Péter Bakosi
2014: Péter Bakosi

Italy

1980: Massimo Di Giorgio
1981: Oscar Raise
1982: Massimo Di Giorgio
1983: Gianni Davito
1984: Paolo Borghi
1985: Luca Toso
1986: Gianni Davito
1987: Daniele Pagani
1988: Luca Toso
1989: Marcello Benvenuti
1990: Daniele Pagani
1991: Fabrizio Borellini
1992: Roberto Ferrari
1993: Ettore Ceresoli
1994: Roberto Ferrari
1995: Ettore Ceresoli
1996: Alessandro Canale
1997: Alessandro Canale
1998: Ivan Bernasconi
1999: Ivan Bernasconi
2000: Alessandro Talotti
2001: Giulio Ciotti
2002: Giulio Ciotti
2003: Andrea Bettinelli
2004: Alessandro Talotti
2005: Nicola Ciotti
2006: Giulio Ciotti
2007: Filippo Campioli
2008: Filippo Campioli
2009: Nicola Ciotti
2010: Filippo Campioli
2011: Silvano Chesani
2012: Gianmarco Tamberi 
2013: Marco Fassinotti
2014: Gianmarco Tamberi 
2015: Marco Fassinotti 
2016: Gianmarco Tamberi 
2017: Eugenio Meloni
2018: Gianmarco Tamberi 
2019: Stefano Sottile
2020: Gianmarco Tamberi
2021: Marco Fassinotti 
2022: Gianmarco Tamberi

Japan

1980: Takeyoshi Sawa
1981: Takao Sakamoto
1982: Takao Sakamoto
1983: Takao Sakamoto
1984: Takao Sakamoto
1985: Shuji Ujino
1986: Shuji Ujino
1987: Motochika Inoue
1988: Takao Sakamoto
1989: Takahisa Yoshida
1990: Sorin Matei (ROM)
1991: Troy Kemp (BAH)
1992: Takahisa Yoshida
1993: Satoru Nonaka
1994: Takahisa Yoshida
1995: Michiya Onoue
1996: Tomohiro Nomura
1997: Takahisa Yoshida
1998: Shigeki Toyoshima
1999: Takahisa Yoshida
2000: Takahisa Yoshida
2001: Takahiro Kimino
2002: Takahiro Uchida
2003: Naoyuki Daigo
2004: Satoru Kubota
2005: Naoyuki Daigo
2006: Naoyuki Daigo
2007: Naoyuki Daigo
2008: Hikaru Tsuchiya
2009: Naoyuki Daigo
2010: Hiromi Takahari
2011: Naoto Tobe
2012: Hiromi Takahari
2013: Hiromi Takahari
2014: Takashi Eto
2015: Naoto Tobe
2016: Takashi Eto
2017: Takashi Eto
2018: Takashi Eto
2019: Naoto Tobe
2020: Tomohiro Shinno

Latvia

1991: Normunds Sietiņš
1992: Normunds Sietiņš
1993: Gints Klepeckis
1994: Normunds Sietiņš
1995: Pēteris Valdmanis
1996: Rojs Piziks
1997: Pēteris Valdmanis
1998: Pēteris Valdmanis
1999: Alvis Ērglis
2000: Alvis Ērglis
2001: Māris Prikulis
2002: Raivis Broks
2003: Kārlis Valdmanis
2004: Normunds Pūpols
2005: Normunds Pūpols
2006: Normunds Pūpols
2007: Normunds Pūpols
2008: Normunds Pūpols
2009: Normunds Pūpols
2010: Toms Andersons

Lithuania

1990: Rolandas Verkys
1991: Rolandas Verkys
1992: Arûnas Stankaitis
1993: Rolandas Verkys
1994: Gintaras Varanauskas
1995: Gintaras Varanauskas
1996: Rolandas Verkys
1997: Gintaras Varanauskas
1998: Mindaugas Rutkauskas
1999: Gintaras Varanauskas
2000: Deividas Rinkevičius
2001: Aurelijus Eirošius
2002: Aurelijus Eirošius
2003: Aurelijus Eirošius
2004: Modestas Žukauskas
2005: Nerijus Bužas
2006: Nerijus Bužas
2007: Rimantas Mėlinis
2008: Raivydas Stanys
2009: Raivydas Stanys

Netherlands

1980: Ruud Wielart
1981: René van Loon
1982: Erik Rollenberg
1983: Erik Rollenberg
1984: Marco Schmidt
1985: Ruud Wielart
1986: Ruud Wielart
1987: Marco Schmidt
1988: Ruud Wielart
1989: Gustav Borremans
1990: Henk-Jan Gebben
1991: Bert Albers
1992: Sven Ootjers
1993: Bjorn Groen
1994: Sven Ootjers
1995: Wilbert Pennings
1996: Bjorn Groen
1997: Bjorn Groen
1998: Wilbert Pennings
1999: Wilbert Pennings
2000: Wilbert Pennings
2001: Wilbert Pennings
2002: Wilbert Pennings
2003: Wilbert Pennings
2004: Jan Peter Larsen
2005: Jan Peter Larsen
2006: Jan Peter Larsen
2007: Martijn Nuijens
2008: Jan Peter Larsen
2009: Martijn Nuijens
2010: Martijn Nuijens
2011: Douwe Amels
2012: Douwe Amels
2013: Douwe Amels
2014: Douwe Amels
2015: Jan Peter Larsen
2016: Jan Peter Larsen

New Zealand

1980: Terry Lomax
1981: Dave McDonald
1982: Roger Te Puni
1983: Roger Te Puni
1984: Roger Te Puni
1985: Roger Te Puni
1986: Roger Te Puni
1987: Roger Te Puni
1988: Steven Hollings
1989: Roger Te Puni
1990: Jeff Brown
1991: Roger Te Puni
1992: Roger Te Puni
1993: Roger Te Puni
1994: Roger Te Puni
1995: Glenn Howard
1996: Glenn Howard
1997: Glenn Howard
1998: Glenn Howard
1999: Glenn Howard
2000: Glenn Howard
2001: Glenn Howard
2002: Bae Kyung-Ho (KOR)
2003: Glenn Howard
2004: Bae Kyung-Ho (KOR)
2005: Ben Giles
2006: Billy Crayford
2007: Grant Knaggs
2008: Duncan Noble
2009: Billy Crayford
2010: Billy Crayford
2011: Billy Crayford
2012: Billy Crayford
2013: Billy Crayford

Norway

1980: Terje Totland
1981: Terje Totland
1982: Jan Hegland
1983: Terje Totland
1984: Terje Totland
1985: Bjørn Eskild Ødegaard
1986: Håkon Särnblom
1987: Gisle Ellingsen
1988: Håkon Särnblom
1989: Håkon Särnblom
1990: Håkon Särnblom
1991: Steinar Hoen
1992: Håkon Särnblom
1993: Steinar Hoen
1994: Steinar Hoen
1995: Steinar Hoen
1996: Steinar Hoen
1997: Steinar Hoen
1998: Steinar Hoen
1999: Bjørn Olsson
2000: Arjan Bos
2001: Jan Olav Husbyn
2002: Jon Sigurd Utgårdsløkken
2003: Jon Sigurd Utgårdsløkken
2004: Jon Sigurd Utgårdsløkken
2005: Andreas Aune Viken
2006: Steinar Grini

Poland

1980: Jacek Wszoła
1981: Janusz Trzepizur
1982: Jacek Wszoła
1983: Janusz Trzepizur
1984: Jacek Wszoła
1985: Jacek Wszoła
1986: Dariusz Zielke
1987: Krzysztof Krawczyk
1988: Jacek Wszoła
1989: Artur Partyka
1990: Artur Partyka
1991: Artur Partyka
1992: Artur Partyka
1993: Artur Partyka
1994: Artur Partyka
1995: Artur Partyka
1996: Artur Partyka
1997: Artur Partyka
1998: Artur Partyka
1999: Artur Partyka
2000: Artur Partyka
2001: Grzegorz Sposób
2002: Grzegorz Sposób
2003: Aleksander Waleriańczyk
2004: Robert Wolski
2005: Michał Bieniek
2006: Grzegorz Sposób
2007: Aleksander Waleriańczyk
2008: Grzegorz Sposób
2009: Grzegorz Sposób
2010: Wojciech Theiner
2011: Piotr Śleboda
2012: Szymon Kiecana
2013: Szymon Kiecana
2014: Sylwester Bednarek
2015: Sylwester Bednarek
2016: Sylwester Bednarek
2017: Sylwester Bednarek
2018: Maciej Grynienko
2019: Sylwester Bednarek

Portugal

1980: Vítor Mendes
1981: Vítor Mendes
1982: Vítor Mendes
1983: Vítor Mendes
1984: José Carlos Lima
1985: Vítor Mendes
1986: Luís Marto
1987: Luís Marto
1988: Fernando Esteves Costa
1989: Fernando Esteves Costa
1990: Fernando Esteves Costa
1991: Fernando Esteves Costa
1992: Fernando Esteves Costa
1993: Fernando Esteves Costa
1994: Fernando Esteves Costa
1995: Fernando Esteves Costa
1996: Rafael Gonçalves
1997: Pedro Raposo
1998: Fernando Esteves Costa
1999: Fernando Esteves Costa
2000: Jonas Mattes
2001: Rafael Gonçalves
2002: Jonas Mattes
2003: Paulo Gonçalves
2004: Rafael Gonçalves
2005: Rafael Gonçalves
2006: Carlos Pereira
2007: Paulo Gonçalves
2008: Paulo Gonçalves
2009: Ricardo Nunes
2010: Roman Guliy
2011: Paulo Gonçalves
2012: Roman Guliy

Romania

1980: Adrian Proteasa
1981: Adrian Proteasa
1982: Sorin Matei
1983: Eugen-Cristian Popescu
1984: Sorin Matei
1985: Constantin Militaru
1986: Sorin Matei
1987: Eugen-Cristian Popescu
1988: Eugen-Cristian Popescu
1989: Eugen-Cristian Popescu
1990: Eugen-Cristian Popescu
1991: Sorin Matei
1992: Constantin Militaru
1993: Eugen-Cristian Popescu
1994: Eugen-Cristian Popescu
1995: Sorin Matei
1996: Ştefan Vasilache
1997: Robert Lungu
1998: Eugen-Cristian Popescu
1999: Eugen-Cristian Popescu
2000: Ştefan Vasilache
2001: Ştefan Vasilache
2002: Ştefan Vasilache
2003: Ştefan Vasilache
2004: Ştefan Vasilache
2005: Ştefan Vasilache
2006: Ştefan Vasilache

Russia

1992: Vladimir Sokolov
1993: Aleksey Yemelin
1994: Leonid Pumalainen
1995: Grigoriy Fedorkov
1996: Aleksey Denisov
1997: Grigoriy Fedorkov
1998: Aleksey Krysin
1999: Vyacheslav Voronin
2000: Sergey Klyugin
2001: Sergey Klyugin
2002: Yaroslav Rybakov
2003: Yaroslav Rybakov
2004: Yaroslav Rybakov
2005: Vyacheslav Voronin
2006: Andrey Silnov
2007: Yaroslav Rybakov
2008: Yaroslav Rybakov
2009: Ivan Ukhov
2010: Aleksandr Shustov
2011: Aleksey Dmitrik
2012: Ivan Ukhov

South Africa

1980: Reinhard Schiel
1981: Reinhard Schiel
1982: Christo de Wet
1983: Edwin Ludick
1984: Edwin Ludick
1985: Lambertus de Wilzem
1986: Christo de Wet
1987: Christo Vrey
1988: Gert Pieterse
1989: Wimpie Louw
1990: Louis Kotze
1991: Louis Kotze
1992: Louis Kotze
1993: Flippie van Vuuren
1994: Gidius Botha
1995: C.J. Roux
1996: C.J. Roux
1997: Gavin Lendis
1998: Gavin Lendis
1999: Malcolm Hendriks
2000: Jacques Freitag
2001: Jacques Freitag
2002: Jacques Freitag
2003: Ramsey Carelse
2004: Ramsey Carelse
2005: Jacques Freitag
2006: Ramsey Carelse
2007: Ramsey Carelse
2008: Hurbert de Beer
2009: Ramsey Carelse
2010: Calvin-Lee Maclangwe
2011: Hurbert de Beer
2012: Ruan Claasen
2013: Ruan Claasen
2014: Mpho Links
2015: Mpho Links
2016: Mpho Links
2017: Christopher Moleya
2018: Christopher Moleya

Soviet Union

1980: Raimondas Kazlauskas
1981: Aleksandr Grigoryev
1982: Aleksey Demyanyuk
1983: Valeriy Sereda
1984: Viktor Malchugin
1985: Igor Paklin
1986: Valeriy Sereda
1987: Gennadiy Avdeyenko
1988: Gennadiy Avdeyenko
1989: Rudolf Povarnitsyn
1990: Aleksey Yemelin
1991: Igor Paklin
1992: Igor Paklin

Spain
Source:

1980: Roberto Cabrejas
1981: Miguel Ángel Moral
1982: Roberto Cabrejas
1983: Miguel Ángel Moral
1984: Roberto Cabrejas
1985: Gustavo Becker
1986: Gustavo Becker
1987: Arturo Ortíz
1988: Arturo Ortíz
1989: Gustavo Becker
1990: Arturo Ortíz
1991: Arturo Ortíz
1992: Arturo Ortíz
1993: Arturo Ortíz
1994: Gustavo Becker
1995: Arturo Ortíz
1996: Arturo Ortíz
1997: Arturo Ortíz
1998: Ignacio Pérez
1999: Javier Villalobos
2000: David Antona
2001: Javier Villalobos
2002: Ignacio Pérez
2003: Javier Bermejo
2004: Javier Bermejo
2005: Javier Bermejo
2006: David Antona
2007: Javier Bermejo
2008: Javier Bermejo
2009: Javier Bermejo
2010: Javier Bermejo
2011: Miguel Angel Sancho
2012: Javier Bermejo
2013: Simón Siverio
2014: Miguel Angel Sancho

Sweden

1980: Jan From
1981: Patrik Sjöberg
1982: Patrik Sjöberg
1983: Patrik Sjöberg
1984: Patrik Sjöberg
1985: Patrik Sjöberg
1986: Patrik Sjöberg
1987: Patrik Sjöberg
1988: Mats Kollbrink
1989: Patrik Sjöberg
1990: Thomas Eriksson
1991: Thomas Eriksson
1992: Patrick Thavelin
1993: Patrick Thavelin
1994: Patrick Thavelin
1995: Staffan Strand
1996: Staffan Strand
1997: Staffan Strand
1998: Stefan Holm
1999: Stefan Holm
2000: Stefan Holm
2001: Stefan Holm
2002: Stefan Holm
2003: Stefan Holm
2004: Stefan Holm
2005: Stefan Holm
2006: Stefan Holm
2007: Stefan Holm
2008: Stefan Holm

Ukraine 

1992: Yuriy Sergiyenko
1993: Viacheslav Tyrtyshnik
1994: Yuriy Sergiyenko
1995: Serhiy Kolesnyk
1996: Viacheslav Tyrtyshnik
1997: 
1998: Viacheslav Tyrtyshnik
1999: Serhiy Dymchenko
2000: Andriy Sokolovskyy
2001: Andriy Sokolovskyy
2002: Ruslan Hlivinskiy
2003: Andriy Sokolovskyy
2004: Andriy Sokolovskyy
2005: Yuriy Krymarenko
2006: Andriy Sokolovskyy
2007: Viktor Shapoval
2008: Yuriy Krymarenko
2009: Viktor Shapoval
2010: Dmytro Dem'yanyuk
2011: Bohdan Bondarenko
2012: Andriy Protsenko
2013: Yuriy Krymarenko
2014: Dmytro Yakovenko
2015: Dmytro Yakovenko
2016: Dmytro Yakovenko
2017: Viktor Lonskyy
2018: Andriy Protsenko
2019: Andriy Protsenko
2020: Andriy Protsenko

United States

1980: Franklin Jacobs
1981: Tyke Peacock
1982: Milton Ottey (CAN) Benn Fields
1983: Dwight Stones
1984: Jim Howard
1985: Brian Stanton
1986: Doug Nordquist
1987: Jerome Carter
1988: Doug Nordquist
1989: Brian Brown
1990: Hollis Conway
1991: Hollis Conway
1992: Hollis Conway
1993: Hollis Conway
1994: Hollis Conway
1995: Charles Austin
1996: Charles Austin
1997: Charles Austin
1998: Charles Austin
1999: Charles Austin
2000: Charles Austin
2001: Nathan Leeper
2002: Nathan Leeper
2003: Jamie Nieto
2004: Jamie Nieto
2005: Matt Hemingway
2006: Tora Harris
2007: Jim Dilling
2008: Jesse Williams
2009: Tora Harris
2010: Jesse Williams
2011: Jesse Williams
2012: Jamie Nieto
2013: Erik Kynard
2014: Erik Kynard
2015: Erik Kynard
2016: Erik Kynard
2017: Bryan McBride
2018: Jeron Robinson
2019: Jeron Robinson
2020:
2022: Shelby McEwen

Yugoslavia

1980: Danial Temim
1981: Danial Temim
1982: Novica Čanović
1983: Novica Čanović
1984: Novica Čanović
1985: Sašo Apostolovski
1986: Novica Čanović
1987: Novica Čanović
1988: Miha Prijon
1989: Sašo Apostolovski
1990: Stevan Zorić
1991: Momir Stefanović
1992: Stevan Zorić
1993: Dragutin Topić
1994: Stevan Zorić
1995: Stevan Zorić
1996: Dragutin Topić
1997: Đorđe Niketić 
1998: Đorđe Niketić 
1999: Dragutin Topić
2000: Dragutin Topić
2001: Đorđe Niketić 
2002: Đorđe Niketić

References

 GBRathletics

See also
 National champions High Jump (women)

Men
National
High jump